The 2015 season for  began in January at the Tour de San Luis. As a UCI WorldTeam, they were automatically invited and obliged to send a squad to every event in the UCI World Tour.

Team roster

Riders who joined the team for the 2015 season

Riders who left the team during or after the 2014 season

Season victories

National, Continental and World champions 2015

Footnotes

References

External links
 

2015 road cycling season by team
2015
2015 in Belgian sport